WSVZ (98.3 FM) is a radio station licensed to Tower Hill, Illinois.  WSVZ airs a country music format and is owned by Kaskaskia Broadcasting, Inc.

External links

Country radio stations in the United States
RAN
Radio stations established in 1997
1997 establishments in Illinois
Shelby County, Illinois